Inderpaul Khela (born 6 October 1983) is an English former footballer who played in the Football League for Kidderminster Harriers.

External links
 Inderpaul Khela stats at Neil Brown stat site
 Inderpaul Khela stats at Harriers Online

English footballers
English Football League players
1983 births
Living people
Bedworth United F.C. players
Kidderminster Harriers F.C. players
AFC Telford United players
Association football midfielders